Chester Leroy Gardner (16 March 1898 in Grant City, Missouri – 3 September 1938 in Flemington, New Jersey) was an American racecar driver, named by promoters as "The Grand Old Man of Auto Racing."

He was killed in an accident during a time trial at the Flemington Fair Speedway when he swerved to avoid a child that had run onto the racetrack. He was survived by his wife, Fannie M. Gardner, and three brothers, Dean Orville Gardner, Ray Alva Gardner, and Paul Theodore Gardner.

Career 
Chet started racing in 1922 in Colorado. In 1933 he won the Midwest AAA Sprint Car Championship. He was named "Southern Dirt Racing King" twice.

Between 1928 and 1938, Chet made 25 starts in the AAA series, where his best result was 3rd.
From 1930 to 1938 he competed in the Indianapolis 500 (see below for stats).

Indianapolis 500 Career Summary 

Ref.:

References

External links
 "King of the Money Drivers" Popular Mechanics, April 1936, pp. 554-556

1898 births
1938 deaths
AAA Championship Car drivers
Indianapolis 500 drivers
People from Grant City, Missouri
Racing drivers from Missouri
Racing drivers who died while racing
Sports deaths in New Jersey